Varmárvöllur is a multi-use stadium in Mosfellsbær, Iceland.  It is currently used mostly for football matches and is the home stadium of Ungmennafélagið Afturelding. Its capacity is around 2500.

References

External links

Football venues in Iceland